Joutsjärvi is a medium-sized lake in the Kymijoki main catchment area. It is located in the region Päijänne Tavastia in Finland.

See also
List of lakes in Finland

References

Lakes of Sysmä